The 2013 Jacksonville Dolphins football team represented Jacksonville University in the 2013 NCAA Division I FCS football season. They were led by seventh-year head coach Kerwin Bell and played their home games at D. B. Milne Field. They were a member of the Pioneer Football League. They finished the season 5–6, 4–4 in PFL play to finish in sixth place.

Schedule

Source: Schedule

References

Jacksonville
Jacksonville Dolphins football seasons
Jacksonville Dolphins football